During the heyday of rail transportation in the first half of the 20th century, Chicago, Illinois reigned as the undisputed railroad center of the United States and was served by six intercity train terminals at its peak. With the decline of passenger rail in the United States, service was consolidated at Union Station with inter-city Amtrak trains. Commuter railroad Metra continues passenger service at LaSalle Street Station, Millennium Station, and Ogilvie Transportation Center, as well as Union Station. Three Metra services are operated by the Union Pacific Railroad, while another is operated by the BNSF Railway. The South Shore Line, an independent commuter/interurban line operates out of Millennium Station. Most of the terminals were in the downtown area called the "Chicago Loop." Ogiltree Station and Union Station were west of the Chicago River and the Loop; Wells Station was north of the river and the Loop. 

The table below shows all railroads that have served downtown Chicago and what terminal they used.

Services partially replaced by or wholly discontinued with Amtrak are marked in Bold.

NOTE: From 1883 to 1892, the Baltimore and Ohio Railroad had a depot between Madison and Monroe Streets, trackage rights via the Illinois Central Railroad. 

The New York, Chicago and St. Louis Railroad ("Nickel Plate Road") used the Illinois Central Railroad local station at 22nd Street in 1882, and the B&O depot in 1883.

Future tenants of Dearborn Station used the Chicago and Western Indiana Railroad depot at 12th and State between 1880 and 1885.

The Wabash, St. Louis and Pacific Railway used its own depot before gaining access to 12th and State depot in 1882.

The Chicago, Terre Haute and Southeastern Railway, later part of the Chicago, Milwaukee, St. Paul and Pacific Railroad ("Milwaukee Road"), never had passenger service in the Chicago area.

The Chicago North Shore and Milwaukee Railroad and the Chicago Aurora and Elgin Railroad used tracks of the Chicago "L", specifically the Loop Elevated and Wells Street Terminal.

The Chicago and Joliet Electric Railway had a terminal at Archer Avenue and Cicero Avenue.

In the aftermath of the Great Chicago Fire, a C&NW freight depot at State and Water Streets was used as a temporary passenger depot since Wells Street Station had burned.

"Canal Street" refers to two depots: the C&NW depot (former Chicago, St. Paul and Fond du Lac Railroad) and the original Galena and Chicago Union Railroad depot (later used by the Chicago and Milwaukee Railway). Both burned in 1871, only the C&NW depot was rebuilt.

References

Transportation in Chicago
Metra